David Chibana (born 24 August 1993) is a Japanese muay thai kickboxer, currently competing in the super bantamweight division of RISE.

A professional competitor since 2012, Chibana is the former WBC Muaythai Japan Bantamweight champion, former INNOVATION Bantamweight champion and the former WMC Japan Bantamweight and Featherweight champion. 

Between September and December 2021, Combat Press ranked him as a top ten flyweight kickboxer in the world.

Muay thai career

M-Fight
Chibana was scheduled to fight Ubai at M-1 Sutt Yod Muaythai vol.4 Part 1 on November 11, 2012. He won the fight by unanimous decision, with scores of 30–28, 29–28 and 29–28.

Chibana was scheduled to face Masaki Takeuchi at TNK1 feat.REBELS on June 9, 2013. He lost the fight by unanimous decision, with all three judges scoring the fight as 30–29 for Takeuchi.

Chibana was scheduled to face Yuta Watanabe at M-FIGHT The Battle of Muaythai V on July 6, 2014. He lost the fight by split decision, with one judge awarding him a 49–48 scorecard, while the other two judges scored the fight 49–48 in Watanabe's favor.

Chibana was scheduled to face Satoshi Katashima at M-FIGHT Suk WEERASAKRECK VII on September 21, 2014. Katashima won the fight by unanimous decision, with scores of 30–29, 30–28 and 29–28.

Chibana was scheduled to face Tatsuya Osawa at WPMF JAPAN The Battle of Muaythai VI on December 7, 2014. The fight was ruled a draw.

Chibana was scheduled to face KOUMA at M-ONE on March 21, 2016. He lost the fight by a third-round technical knockout.

Battle of Muaythai
Chibana was scheduled to fight a rematch with Kunihiro at The Battle Of Muaythai 13 on December 4, 2016. The previously fought to a draw, under kickboxing rules, in the finals of the 2016 AJKF Super Bantamweight tournament. He won the fight by a fourth-round technical knockout.

Chibana was scheduled to face Kim Kiheung for the WMC Japan Super Bantamweight title at The Battle Of Muaythai 14 on April 9, 2017. He won the fight by a fifth-round knockout.

Chibana was scheduled to make the first defense of his WMC Japan Super Bantamweight title against Takashi Ohno at The Battle Of Muaythai 16 on December 17, 2017. He won the fight by unanimous decision, with scores of 50–48, 50–46 and 50–47.

Chibana was scheduled to face TERU for the WMC Japan Featherweight at Muay Lok 2018 1st on March 18, 2018. He won the fight by unanimous decision, with scores of 50–48, 49–48 and 50–47.

Chibana was scheduled to face Kanta Suzuki at The Battle Of Muay Thai Season 2 vol.4 on July 21, 2019. He won the fight by a second-round knockout.

Chibana was scheduled to face Yugo Kato for the WMC Japan Super Bantamweight title at BOM WAVE 01 on June 28, 2020. He lost the fight by unanimous decision, with scores of 50–48, 50–48 and 49–48.

Kickboxing career

MAJKF Bantamweight Rookie tournament
Chibana made his debut against NAOTO at MAJKF FIGHTERS GATE-11 ~ Open the door of your dreams ~ on April 29, 2012, in a quarterfinal bout of the MAJKF Rookie tournament. He won the fight by a second-round knockout. Chibana faced SHOTA in the tournament semifinals, held at MAJKF BREAK-29 ～SHARPLY～ on September 23, 2012. He won the fight by unanimous decision. Chibana faced Yu ☆ Tone in the MAJKF Rookie tournament final, held at MAJKF BREAK-32 -SEIZE- on December 9, 2012. He won the fight by unanimous decision, with scores of 30–28, 29–28 and 30–28.

Innovation

Innovation Bantamweight tournament
Chibana's next kickboxing appearance was in the quarterfinals of the Innovation Bantamweight tournament, held at JAPAN KICKBOXING INNOVATION Creative Distraction Detonation on July 7, 2013. He won the fight by unanimous decision, with all three judges awarding him a 30–28 scorecard. Chibana advanced to the tournament semifinal, held at JAPAN KICKBOXING INNOVATION Creative Distraction ~ Flame ~ on September 15, 2013. He won the fight by unanimous decision, with scores of 30–29, 29–28 and 29–28. Chibana faced Takuma Ito in the tournament final at JAPAN KICKBOXING INNOVATION Dream Force-I on April 29, 2014. Ito won the fight by unanimous decision, with scores of 49–48, 49–47 and 48–48.

Innovation Bantamweight champion
Chibana was scheduled to face the 42-year old veteran EIJI for the Innovation Bantamweight championship at JAPAN KICKBOXING INNOVATION: Dream Force－7 on April 26, 2015. Chibana won the fight by unanimous decision, with all three judges awarding him a 50–43 scorecard. Chibana knocked EIJI down in the second, third and fifth rounds, with all three coming as a result of a head kick.

Chibana was scheduled to make his first title defense against the DEEP KICK super bantamweight champion Masahiko Suzuki at JAPAN KICKBOXING INNOVATION: Join Forces-1 on June 5, 2016. Suzuki won the fight by a third-round technical knockout. Chibana was knocked down with a left hook, with the referee stopping the fight as Chibana wasn't able to defend himself from the following punches.

AJKF

AJKF Super Bantamweight tournament
Chibana was scheduled to participate in the 2016 AJFK Super Bantamweight tournament, held at KICKBOXING ZONE 5 on September 11, 2016. He took on Dynamite Kakizaki in the semifinals, and won by unanimous decision. Chibana advanced to the tournament finals, where he faced Kunihiro. The fight was ruled a draw, even after an extension round was fought. As no winner was declared, the title was kept by the organization.

Later AJKF appearances
Chibana was scheduled to make his RISE debut against Yugo Flyskygym at RISE 117 on May 20, 2017. He lost the fight by unanimous decision, with scores of 28–27, 28–27 and 28–26. Although he scored a knockdown against Yugo in the third round, Chibana was deducted a point each in the second and third round.

Chibana was scheduled to face HIROYUKI at AJKF MAGNUM 45 on October 22, 2017. He won the fight by a fourth-round knockout.

Chibana was scheduled to face Taku Okubo at MAJKF ～FIGHT FOR PEACE 9～ on May 20, 2018. The fight was ruled a draw.

Chibana was scheduled to face Hiroya Haga for the NJKF 55 kg title at NJKF 2018 3rd on September 22, 2018. He lost the fight by unanimous decision, with scores of 49–47, 50–47 and 50–47.

Chibana was scheduled to fight a rematch with Taku Okubo at MAJKF: Soeno Dojo 50th Anniversary Tournament on April 21, 2019, for the WMAF World Super Bantamweight. He won the fight by a first-round knockout.

Chibana was scheduled to face Ryota Mawatari at NJKF 2019 3rd on September 23, 2019. He lost the fight by unanimous decision.

Chibana was scheduled to face Kenichi Takeuchi at Bigbang 37: The Road to Unification on December 29, 2019. The fight was ruled a majority draw.

RISE
Chibana was scheduled to make his return to RISE against a fellow veteran Yuki Kyotani at RISE 141 on August 23, 2020. He lost the fight by unanimous decision, with scores of 29–28, 29–28 and 30–28.

Chibana was scheduled to face the former DEEP KICK super bantamweight champion Ryota Naito at RISE 144 on December 18, 2020. He won the fight by a third-round knockout, stopping Naito at the very last second of the bout.

Chibana was scheduled to face Rasta Kido at RISE 151 on July 28, 2021. The fight was ruled a draw after the first three rounds and accordingly went into an extension round. Chibana was awarded the split decision, after the extra round was fought.

Chibana was scheduled to fight the #2 ranked RISE bantamweight Kengo at RISE World Series 2021 Osaka 2. Chibana lost the fight by majority decision, with scores of 30-29, 29-29 and 30-28.

Chibana was booked to face the fifth ranked RISE super flyweight Kyosuke at RISE 159 on June 24, 2022. He won the fight by a third-round knockout.

Championships and accomplishments
MA Japan Kickboxing Federation
2012 MAJKF Bantamweight Rookie Tournament Winner
2019 WMAF World Super Bantamweight Championship
INNOVATION
2015 INNOVATION Bantamweight Championship
World Boxing Council Muaythai
2015 WBC Muaythai Japan Bantamweight Championship
World Muaythai Council
2017 WMC Japan Bantamweight Championship
2018 WMC Japan Featherweight Championship

Fight record

|-  style="background:#cfc;"
| 2022-06-24 || Win ||align=left| Kyosuke || Rise 159 || Tokyo, Japan || KO (Punches) || 3|| 1:54
|-  style="background:#fbb;"
| 2021-11-14 || Loss ||align=left| Kengo || Rise World Series Osaka 2 || Osaka, Japan || Decision (Majority) || 3 || 3:00
|-
|-  style="background:#cfc;"
| 2021-07-28 || Win ||align=left| Rasta Kido || Rise 151 || Tokyo, Japan || Ext. R. Decision (Split) || 4 || 3:00
|-
|-  style="background:#cfc;"
| 2020-12-18 || Win ||align=left| Ryota Naito || Rise 144 || Tokyo, Japan || KO (Left hook) || 3 || 2:59
|-
|-  style="background:#fbb;"
| 2020-08-23 || Loss ||align=left| Yuki Kyotani || Rise 141 || Tokyo, Japan || Decision (Unanimous) || 3 || 3:00
|-
|-  style="background:#fbb;"
| 2020-06-28 || Loss ||align=left| Yugo Kato || BOM WAVE 01 || Yokohama, Japan || Decision (Unanimous) || 5 || 3:00
|-
! style=background:white colspan=9 |
|-
|-  style="background:#c5d2ea;"
| 2019-12-29 || Draw ||align=left| Kenichi Takeuchi || Bigbang 37: The Road to Unification || Tokyo, Japan || Decision (Majority) || 3 || 3:00
|-
|-  style="background:#fbb;"
| 2019-09-23 || Loss ||align=left| Ryota Mawatari || NJKF 2019 3rd || Tokyo, Japan || Decision (Unanimous) || 3 || 3:00
|-
|-  style="background:#cfc;"
| 2019-07-21 || Win ||align=left| Kanta Suzuki || The Battle Of Muay Thai Season 2 vol.4 || Tokyo, Japan || KO (Right hook) || 2 || 3:00
|-
|-  style="background:#cfc;"
| 2019-04-21 || Win ||align=left| Taku Okubo || MAJKF: Soeno Dojo 50th Anniversary Tournament || Tokyo, Japan || KO (Left hook) || 1 || 2:17
|-
! style=background:white colspan=9 |
|-
|-  style="background:#fbb;"
| 2018-09-22 || Loss||align=left| Hiroya Haga || NJKF 2018 3rd || Tokyo, Japan || Decision (Unanimous) || 5 || 3:00
|-
! style=background:white colspan=9 |
|-
|-  style="background:#c5d2ea;"
| 2018-05-20 || Draw ||align=left| Taku Okubo || MAJKF ～FIGHT FOR PEACE 9～ || Tokyo, Japan || Decision (Unanimous) || 3 || 3:00
|-
|-  style="background:#cfc;"
| 2018-03-18 || Win ||align=left| TERU || Muay Lok 2018 1st || Tokyo, Japan || Decision (Unanimous) || 5 || 3:00
|-
! style=background:white colspan=9 |
|-
|-  style="background:#fbb;"
| 2017-12-17 || Loss ||align=left| Takashi Ohno || The Battle Of Muaythai 16 || Kanagawa, Japan || Decision (Unanimous) || 5 || 3:00
|-
! style=background:white colspan=9 |
|-
|-  style="background:#cfc;"
| 2017-10-22 || Win ||align=left| HIROYUKI || AJKF MAGNUM 45 || Tokyo, Japan || KO (Knees) || 4 || 3:00
|-
|-  style="background:#fbb;"
| 2017-05-20 || Loss ||align=left| Yugo Flyskygym || RISE 117 || Tokyo, Japan || Decision (Unanimous) || 3 || 3:00
|-
|-  style="background:#cfc;"
| 2017-04-09 || Win ||align=left| Kim Kiheung || The Battle Of Muaythai 14 || Tokyo, Japan || KO (Right hook) || 5 || 3:00
|-
! style=background:white colspan=9 |
|-
|-  style="background:#cfc;"
| 2017-02-05 || Win ||align=left| Ryo Takahashi || NKB Kamikaze Series VOL.1  || Tokyo, Japan || Decision (Unanimous) || 5 || 3:00
|-
|-  style="background:#cfc;"
| 2016-12-04 || Win ||align=left| Kunihiro || The Battle Of Muaythai 13 || Kanagawa, Japan || TKO (Doctor stoppage) || 4 || 0:58
|-
|-  style="background:#c5d2ea;"
| 2016-09-11 || Draw ||align=left| Kunihiro || KICKBOXING ZONE 5 Okinawa, Tournament Final || Okinawa, Japan || Decision (Split) || 4 || 3:00
|-
! style=background:white colspan=9 |
|-
|-  style="background:#cfc;"
| 2016-09-11 || Win ||align=left| Dynamite Kakizaki || KICKBOXING ZONE 5 Okinawa, Tournament Semifinal || Okinawa, Japan || Decision (Unanimous) || 3 || 3:00
|-
|-  style="background:#fbb;"
| 2016-06-05 || Loss ||align=left| Masahiko Suzuki || JAPAN KICKBOXING INNOVATION: Join Forces-1 || Tokyo, Japan || TKO (Referee Stoppage) || 3 || 2:20
|-
! style=background:white colspan=9 |
|-
|-  style="background:#fbb;"
| 2016-03-21 || Loss ||align=left| KOUMA || M-ONE || Tokyo, Japan || TKO (Doctor Stoppage) || 3 || 1:16
|-
|-  style="background:#cfc;"
| 2015-09-27 || Win ||align=left| Hiroki Maeda || NJKF 2015 6th || Tokyo, Japan || Decision (Unanimous) || 5 || 3:00
|-
! style=background:white colspan=9 |
|-
|-  style="background:#cfc;"
| 2015-04-26 || Win ||align=left| EIJI || JAPAN KICKBOXING INNOVATION: Dream Force－7 || Tokyo, Japan || Decision (Unanimous) || 5 || 3:00
|-
! style=background:white colspan=9 |
|-
|-  style="background:#cfc;"
| 2015-03-13 || Win ||align=left| Buriburizaemon  || TENKAICHI FIGHT || Fujioka, Gunma, Japan || Decision (Unanimous) || 3 || 3:00
|-
|-  style="background:#c5d2ea;"
| 2014-12-07 || Draw ||align=left| Tatsuya Osawa || WPMF JAPAN The Battle of Muaythai VI || Kanagawa, Japan || Decision (Unanimous) || 3 || 3:00
|-
|-  style="background:#fbb;"
| 2014-09-21 || Loss||align=left| Satoshi Katashima || M-FIGHT Suk WEERASAKRECK VII || Tokyo, Japan || Decision (Unanimous) || 3 || 3:00
|-
|-  style="background:#fbb;"
| 2014-07-06 || Loss||align=left| Yuta Watanabe || M-FIGHT The Battle of Muaythai V || Tokyo, Japan || Decision (Split) || 5 || 3:00
|-
|-  style="background:#fbb;"
| 2014-04-29 || Loss||align=left| Takuma Ito || JAPAN KICKBOXING INNOVATION Dream Force-I, Tournament Final || Tokyo, Japan || Decision (Unanimous) || 5 || 3:00
|-
! style=background:white colspan=9 |
|-
|-  style="background:#cfc;"
| 2013-09-15 || Win ||align=left| RAIDEN || JAPAN KICKBOXING INNOVATION Creative Distraction ~ Flame ~, Tournament Semifinal || Tokyo, Japan || Decision (Unanimous) || 3 || 3:00
|-
|-  style="background:#cfc;"
| 2013-07-07 || Win ||align=left| Yoshiyuki Dobashi || JAPAN KICKBOXING INNOVATION Creative Distraction Detonation, Tournament Quarterfinal || Tokyo, Japan || Decision (Unanimous) || 3 || 3:00
|-
|-  style="background:#fbb;"
| 2013-06-09 || Loss||align=left| Masaki Takeuchi || TNK1 feat.REBELS || Takasaki, Japan || Decision (Unanimous) || 3 || 3:00
|-
|-  style="background:#fbb;"
| 2013-02-24 || Loss||align=left| Tatsuya Rose || TENKAICHI Fight || Takasaki, Japan || Ext. R. Decision (Split) || 4 || 3:00
|-
! style=background:white colspan=9 |
|-
|-  style="background:#cfc;"
| 2012-12-09 || Win ||align=left| Yu ☆ Tone || MAJKF BREAK-32 -SEIZE-, Tournament Final || Tokyo, Japan || Decision (Unanimous) || 3 || 3:00
|-
! style=background:white colspan=9 |
|-
|-  style="background:#cfc;"
| 2012-11-11 || Win ||align=left| Ubai || M-1 Sutt Yod Muaythai vol.4 Part 1 || Tokyo, Japan || Decision (Unanimous) || 3 || 3:00
|-
|-  style="background:#cfc;"
| 2012-09-23 || Win ||align=left| SHOTA || MAJKF BREAK-29 ～SHARPLY～, Tournament Semifinal || Tokyo, Japan || Decision (Unanimous) || 3 || 3:00
|-
|-  style="background:#cfc;"
| 2012-06-24 || Win ||align=left| Kazuki || TENKAICHI FIGHT || Tokyo, Japan || KO || 3 || 
|-
|-  style="background:#cfc;"
| 2012-04-29 || Win ||align=left| NAOTO || MAJKF FIGHTERS GATE-11 ~ Open the door of your dreams ~, Tournament Quarterfinal || Tokyo, Japan || KO || 2 || 1:09
|-
| colspan=9 | Legend:

See also
 List of male kickboxers

References

1993 births
Living people
Japanese male kickboxers
Japanese Muay Thai practitioners
Sportspeople from Tokyo
People from Ōta, Tokyo